Year 949 (CMXLIX) was a common year starting on Monday (link will display the full calendar) of the Julian calendar.

Events 
 By place 

 Byzantine Empire 
 Arab-Byzantine War: Hamdanid forces under Sayf al-Dawla raid into the theme of Lykandos, but are defeated. The Byzantines counter-attack and seize Germanikeia, defeating an army from Tarsus, and raiding as far south as Antioch. General (strategos) Theophilos Kourkouas captures Theodosiopolis (modern-day Erzurum) after a 7-month siege.

 Europe 
 A Byzantine expeditionary force under Constantine Gongyles attempts to re-conquer the Emirate of Crete from the Saracens. The expedition ends in a disastrous failure; the Byzantine camp is destroyed in a surprise attack. Gongyles himself barely escapes on his flagship.
Abd al-Rahman III the Caliph of Córdoba declares Jihad, preparing a large army & conquers the city of Lugo in the extreme North of Iberia. This raid shows to be one of the furthest raids Muslims in Spain ever conducted, done as a show of strength of the Muslim State in Al-Andalus.
 King Miroslav (or Miroslaus) is killed by Ban Pribina during a civil war started by his younger brother Michael Krešimir II, who succeeds him as ruler of Croatia.
 Summer – The Hungarians defeat a Bavarian army at Laa (modern Austria).

 Japan 
 September 14 – Fujiwara no Tadahira, a politician and chancellor (kampaku), dies at his native Kyoto. Having governed Japan as regent under Emperor Suzaku since 930. The Fujiwara clan will continue to hold the regency until 1180, controlling the imperial government.

Births 
 Fujiwara no Nagatō, Japanese bureaucrat and poet (d. 1009)
 Gebhard of Constance, German bishop (d. 995)
 Máel Sechnaill mac Domnaill, High King of Ireland (d. 1022)
 Mathilde, German abbess and granddaughter of Otto I (d. 1011)
 Ranna, Kannada poet (India) (approximate date)
 Symeon (the New Theologian), Byzantine monk and poet (d. 1022)
 Uma no Naishi, Japanese nobleman and waka poet (d. 1011)

Deaths 
 June 1 – Godfrey, Frankish nobleman (approximate date)
 August 17 – Li Shouzhen, Chinese general and governor
 September 14 – Fujiwara no Tadahira, Japanese statesman and regent (b. 880)
 September/October – Abdallah ibn al-Mustakfi, Abbasid caliph (b. 905)

 December – Imad al-Dawla, founder of the Buyid dynasty (Iran)
 December 2 – Odo of Wetterau, German nobleman 
 December 10 – Herman I, duke of Swabia
date unknown
An, Chinese imperial consort (Five Dynasties)
Eadric, ealdorman of Wessex (approximate date)
Jeongjong, king of Goryeo (Korea) (b. 923)
Miroslav (or Miroslaus), king of Croatia
Xiao Han, general of the Khitan Liao dynasty
Yunmen Wenyan, Chinese Zen Buddhist monk
Zhao Tingyin, general of Later Shu (b. 883)

References